In Switzerland, most of the people have a regular sport activity and one in four is an active member of a sports club. The most important all-embracing organisations for sports in Switzerland are the Federal Office of Sport, and the Swiss Olympic Committee (Swiss Olympic).

Because of its varied landscape and climate, Switzerland offers a large variety of sports to its inhabitants and visitors. While winter sports are enjoyed throughout the country, football and ice hockey remain the most popular sports.

Major sporting events in Switzerland include the Olympic Games, which were held two times in St. Moritz in Winter 1928 and Winter 1948, and, the 1954 FIFA World Cup, the UEFA Euro 2008 in Switzerland and Austria.

Winter sports

Skiing and mountaineering are much practiced by Swiss people and foreigners, the highest summits attract mountaineers from around the world.

As a predominantly mountainous country Switzerland has traditionally been one of the strongest nations in the sport of alpine skiing, where it has a long-running rivalry with neighboring Austria. The Swiss reached their peak in the sport in the 1980s, when they won the overall Nations' Cup in the FIS Alpine Ski World Cup for seven consecutive years from 1981 to 1987. Switzerland's most successful alpine skiers include Pirmin Zurbriggen, Peter Müller, Bernhard Russi, Didier Cuche, Franz Heinzer and Michael von Grünigen among the men and Vreni Schneider, Erika Hess, Michela Figini, Maria Walliser, Marie Therese Nadig, Sonja Nef, Lise-Marie Morerod and Brigitte Oertli among the women.

Switzerland is also notable as the birthplace of competitive sledding, which originated in the Swiss resort of St. Moritz, which was also where the first bobsleigh was constructed in the late nineteenth century. Switzerland has traditionally been a strong nation in bobsleigh, enjoying a particularly fierce rivalry with East Germany in the 1970s and 1980s.

Simon Ammann has been one of the world's best ski jumpers in the 21st century, whilst Dario Cologna has emerged as one of the top cross-country skiers in the world in the late 2000s.

Curling has been a very popular winter sport for more than 30 years. The Swiss teams have won 3 World Men's Curling Championships and 2 Women's titles. The Swiss men's team skipped by Dominic Andres won a gold medal at 1998 Nagano Winter Olympics.

Stéphane Lambiel, two-time winner of the World Figure Skating Championships amongst numerous other domestic and international competitions, is one of the world's top figure skaters.

Bandy exists in minor form. In September 2017 Switzerland made its debut at the annual rink bandy tournament in Nymburk, Czech Republic. At the 2018 Women's Bandy World Championship, Switzerland will participate.

Ice hockey

Most Swiss people follow ice hockey and support one of the 13 teams of the National League which, as of 2017, is the most-attended European ice hockey league.

In April–May 2009, Switzerland hosted the Ice Hockey World Championships for the 10th time. The Swiss national ice hockey team's latest achievements are two silver medals at the 2013 World Ice Hockey Championships and 2018 World Ice Hockey Championships. The "Nati" is currently ranked 7th at the IIHF World Ranking.

Football

Like many other Europeans, most Swiss are fans of association football and the national team or 'Nati' is widely supported. The national team has previously participated at twelve different FIFA World Cups (last in 2022) and five different UEFA European Championships (last in 2021 and as co-host with Austria in 2008. Also 1996, 2004 and 2016).

At club level Grasshopper Club Zürich holds the records for winning the most national championship titles (27) and the most Swiss Cup trophies (19). More recently FC Basel enjoyed great success on a national (winning 11 championship titles from 2003 to 2017) and international level (qualifying 8 times for the UEFA Champions League Group stage. The first appearance was in 2002).

Basketball

Clint Capela has been the highest paid team athlete in Switzerland's history.

Mies in Switzerland is home to the headquarters of FIBA, the world's governing agency for international events. Unsurprisingly, the country is one of FIBA's founding members and therefore has one of the world's longest basketball traditions.

Once a major team at the international scene, its national team does not have major international significance anymore, despite occasional strong showings at qualification games.

Their have been four Swiss-born NBA players: Thabo Sefolosha, Enes Kanter Freedom, Nikola Vučević and Clint Capela.

American Football

The Nationalliga A is the top level league in Switzerland formed in 1982. Below is the National league B and C. Switzerland has a national team that competes in international tournament play. The Calanda Broncos are the most successful team in Switzerland having won the most Swiss Bowl national championships and was Eurobowl champion in 2012.

Baseball

Baseball is a minor sport in Switzerland.

Tennis

Over the last few decades, swiss tennis players Roger Federer, Stan Wawrinka and Martina Hingis have been at the top of tennis. Federer, Wawrinka and Hingis all have Grand Slam singles titles to their names. Federer has won 20 Grand Slam titles and holds the record for the longest consecutive stay as the world number 1 at 237 weeks. Federer has won a record 8 Wimbledon titles overall and has also won the Australian Open 6 times, the US Open 5 times and the French Open once. Another Swiss tennis figure is Marc Rosset, winning the singles gold medal at the 1992 Olympics. Both Federer and Wawrinka teamed up at the 2008 Olympics to win the doubles gold medal. Federer and Wawrinka had a massive influence in Switzerland winning the Davis Cup title in 2014.

Switzerland also hosts 3 ATP tournaments. The Swiss Indoors takes place in Basel at the St. Jakobshalle and is an ATP 500 event that holds a prominent position in the European indoor hard court swing in autumn. Federer has won it a record 10 times. Other tournaments include the Swiss Open that takes place in Gstaad and the Geneva Open. Both tournaments take place on clay.

Rugby

Swiss rugby dates back over a century.

More recently, 2006-07 Heineken Cup clash  between the French side Bourgoin and Irish rugby's Munster was moved from Bourgoin's home ground, to the Stade de Genève (Geneva Stadium). The stadium's capacity is 30,000, and attendance on the day was 16,255.

Motorsport

Motorsport road racing circuits and events were banned in Switzerland following the 1955 Le Mans disaster with the exception of events held in a time trial format such as hillclimbing. On June 6, 2007 an amendment to lift the ban was passed by the lower house of the Swiss parliament. However the proposed law failed to pass the upper house, and was withdrawn in 2009 after being rejected twice. In 2015 the Swiss government allowed a relaxation of the law, permitting head-to-head racing for electric vehicles only. In June 2018 Switzerland hosted its first motor race in 63 years when the first Zürich ePrix was held as a round of the all-electric Formula E championship.

Despite the long-standing restrictions, the country has produced successful road racing drivers such as Clay Regazzoni, Jo Siffert and successful World Touring Car Championship driver Alain Menu. Switzerland also won the A1GP World Cup of Motorsport in 2007-08 with driver Neel Jani. Swiss racing driver Marcel Fässler won the World Endurance Championship in 2012 and has won the Le Mans 24 Hours three times, and motorcycle racer Thomas Lüthi won the 2005 MotoGP World Championship in the 125cc category. Urs Erbacher is a six time FIA European Drag Racing champion. Also, Formula One constructor Alfa Romeo is based in Switzerland. In recent years, drivers such as Romain Grosjean, Sébastien Buemi and Edoardo Mortara  have been successful in Formula One, Formula E, WEC and Le Mans.

However, other forms of motorsport are permitted, such as rallying, motocross, supermotard, enduro and trials.

High-profile drivers from Formula One and World Rally Championship such as Michael Schumacher, Nick Heidfeld, Kimi Räikkönen, Fernando Alonso, Lewis Hamilton, Sébastien Loeb and Sebastian Vettel all have a residence in Switzerland, sometimes for tax purposes.

Other sports
Switzerland is also the home of the sailing team Alinghi which won the America's Cup in 2003 and defended the title in 2007. Golf is becoming increasingly popular, with already more than 35 courses available and more in planning. André Bossert is a successful Swiss professional golfer.

The Switzerland national beach football team won the Euro Beach football Cup in 2005 and were runners-up twice, in 2008 Euro Beach football Cup and 2009 Euro Beach football Cup. More recently, they were also runners-up in the 2009 FIFA Beach football World Cup that took place in November.

The Switzerland women's national floorball team has become world champion once, in 2005, and taken medals in most other tournaments. The national team for men has taken eight medals in twelve tournaments.

Other sports where the Swiss have been successful include athletics, (Werner Günthör and Markus Ryffel), fencing, (Marcel Fischer), cycling, (Fabian Cancellara, Ferdinand Kübler, Hugo Koblet, Oscar Egg, Jolanda Neff, Stefan Küng), kickboxing (Andy Hug), whitewater slalom (Ronnie Dürrenmatt—canoe, Mathias Röthenmund—kayak), beach volleyball (Sascha Heyer, Markus Egger, Paul and Martin Laciga), professional wrestling (Claudio Castagnoli), and triathlon (Brigitte McMahon, Reto Hug, Sven Riederer, Nicola Spirig, Daniela Ryf).

In cycling, Fabian Cancellara nicknamed 'Spartacus' is one of the best road racer of modern times. He has achieved great success in the classics; he has won Paris–Roubaix three times, the Milan – San Remo once, and the Tour of Flanders three times. Cancellara has won the opening stage of the Tour de France five times and has led the race for 28 days total, which is the most of any rider who has not won the Tour. His success has not been limited to just time trials and classics, as he has won general classification of the Tirreno–Adriatico, Tour de Suisse, and the Tour of Oman. In 2008, he won gold in the individual time trial and silver in the men's road race at the Summer Olympics. In 2016, at the Summer Olympics, he won in his last race of his career gold in the individual time trial. In addition, Cancellara has been the time trial world champion four times in his career.

Switzerland is the third most successful orienteering country in history.

The Swiss national lacrosse team has qualified for the World Lacrosse Championship three consequtive times (2010-2018). At the most recent event (2018), it finished 20th out of 46.

Local sports

Traditional sports include Swiss wrestling or "Schwingen". It is an old tradition from the rural central cantons and considered the national sport by some. Hornussen is another indigenous Swiss sport, which is like a cross between baseball and golf. Steinstossen is the Swiss variant of stone put, a competition in throwing a heavy stone. Practiced only among the alpine population since prehistoric times, it is recorded to have taken place in Basel in the 13th century. It is also central to the Unspunnenfest, first held in 1805, with its symbol the 83.5 kg stone named Unspunnenstein.

Government
See: Federal Department of Defence, Civil Protection and Sports

Events
Lauberhorn ski races
Patrouille des Glaciers
Weltklasse Zürich
Athletissima
Davidoff Swiss Indoors
Allianz Suisse Open Gstaad
Swiss Cup
Spengler Cup
Tour de Suisse
Tour de Romandie
Omega European Masters

See also
Swiss Sports Personality of the Year
Switzerland at the Olympics
Football in Switzerland
Switzerland men's national ice hockey team
Roger Federer
Martina Hingis
Thabo Sefolosha, the first Swiss NBA player
Antonio Cesaro

Notes and references

External links

Federal Office of Sport
Swiss Olympic